Huaxia (華夏) is a historical concept representing the Chinese nation, and came from the self-awareness of a common cultural ancestry by the various confederations of pre-Qin ethnic ancestors of Han people.

Etymology 
The earliest extant authentic attestion of the concept Huáxià  is in the historical narrative and commentary Zuo zhuan (finished around 300 BCE). In Zuo zhuan, Huaxia refers to the central states (中國 Zhōngguó) in the Yellow River valley, dwelt by the Huaxia people, ethnically equivalent to Han Chinese in pre-imperial discourses.

According to Confucianist Kong Yingda's "True Meaning of Chunqiu Zuo zhuan", xià "grand" signified the "greatness" in the ceremonial etiquettes of the central states, while huá "flower" or "blossom" was used in reference to the "beauty" in the clothing that those states' denizens wore.

History

Origin
Han historian Sima Qian asserts that Xia was the name of the state enfeoffed to legendary king Yu the Great, and Yu used its name as his surname. In modern historiography, Huaxia refers to a confederation of tribes—living along the Yellow River—who were the ancestors of what later became the Han ethnic group in China. During the Warring States (475–221 BCE), the self-awareness of the Huaxia identity developed and took hold in ancient China. Initially, Huaxia defined mainly a civilized society that was distinct and stood in contrast to what was perceived as the barbaric peoples around them. The Huaxia identity arose in the Eastern Zhou period as a reaction to the increased conflict with the Rong and Di peoples who migrated into the Zhou lands and extinguished some Zhou states.

Modern usage
Although still used in conjunction, the Chinese characters for hua and xia are also used separately as autonyms.

The official Chinese names of both the People's Republic of China (PRC) and the Republic of China (ROC) use the term Huaxia in combination with the term Zhongguo (translated as "Middle Kingdom"), that is, as Zhonghua. The PRC's official Chinese name is Zhonghua Renmin Gongheguo, while that of the ROC is Zhonghua Minguo. The term Zhongguo is confined by its association to a state, whereas Zhonghua mainly concerns culture. The latter is being used as part of the nationalist term Zhōnghuá Mínzú which is an all Chinese nationality in the sense of a multi-ethnic national identity.

The term Huaren for a Chinese person is an abbreviation of Huaxia with ren (person). Huaren in general is used for people of Chinese ethnicity, in contrast to Zhongguoren which usually (but not always) refers to citizens of China. Although some may use Zhongguoren to refer to the Chinese ethnicity, such usage is not common in Taiwan. In overseas Chinese communities in countries such as Singapore and Malaysia, Huaren or Huaqiao (overseas Chinese) is used as they are also not citizens of China.

See also 

 Xia dynasty, the first dynasty according to traditional Chinese historiography.
 Yanhuang, an ethnic group located around the Yellow River.
 Yan Huang Zisun, literally the "Descendants of Yan and Huang"
 Zhongyuan, the central regions associated with Huaxia.
 Names of China
 Zhonghua
 Hua–Yi distinction

Notes

References 

Ancient peoples of China
Chinese words and phrases
Han Chinese
Names of China